The 3rd Vislenskaya Red Banner Order of Suvorov and Kutuzov Motor Rifle Division, is a motorized infantry division of the Russian Ground Forces.

The 3rd Motor Rifle Division was formed in 1997 from the amalgamation of the 31st and 47th Guards Tank Divisions of the Moscow Military District in Nizhny Novgorod, and existed until March 2009, when the division was disbanded and split into the 6th Separate Tank Brigade and the 9th Separate Motor Rifle Brigade. The 3rd Motor Rifle Division was reformed in 2016 and based in the town of Valuyki, Belgorod Oblast, as part of the 20th Guards Army in the Western Military District.

History 

The division formed as 3rd 'Vislenskaya (Russian for Vistula) Red Banner Orders of Suvorov and Kutuzov' Motor Rifle Division by amalgamation of 31st and 47th Guards Tank Divisions at Novy in the Moscow Military District on 1 July 1997 gaining the honours of the 31st Tank Division. The Division was in 2004 under the command of General Major Aleksandr Konnov. Elements of the division, notably the two motor rifle regiments, participated in the First Chechen War and Second Chechen War.

Warfare.ru notes that 3rd MRD was unit number 54046, and had constant readiness status. In 2000 the division had 10850 personnel, 244 T-80 tanks, 361 BMP/BTR, 36 2S19 Msta-S, 96 2S3 Akatsiya, and 16 Grad multiple rocket launchers. It consisted of the 100th and 237th Tank Regiments, and the 245th and 752nd Motor Rifle Regiments, as well as the 99th Self-Propelled Artillery Regiment.

In March 2009 the division was disbanded and reorganised as the 6th Separate Tank Brigade and the 9th Separate Motor Rifle Brigade. V/Ch 54046 became the 9th Separate Motorized Rifle Visla Red Banner Order of Suvorov Brigade.

In 2016, the 9th Motor Rifle Brigade moved to Boguchar. Its transition to the west wasn't easy.  The 9th will become the new, reformed 3rd MRD, as announced On 21 October 2016, by Defense Minister Sergey Shoygu.

In 2022, the division took part in the Russian Invasion of Ukraine, with its troops later having to be treated for eating poisoned meals, distributed to them by Ukrainian civilians. Among the high ranking officers the division lost Colonel Igor Yevgenyevich Nikolaev, the commander of the 252nd Guards Motor Rifle Regiment.

The post-Soviet 3rd MRD should not to be confused with 3rd Guards Motor Rifle Division, active during the Cold War.

Structure

1997 
 Headquarters (Novy)
 100th Tank Częstochowa Regiment (Dzerzhinsk)
 237th Tank Regiment (Dzerzhinsk)
 245th Guards Motor Rifle Gniezno Regiment (Mulino)
 752nd Guards Motor Rifle Regiment (Novy settlement, Nizhny Novgorod)
 99th Guards Self-Propelled Artillery Pomeranian Regiment (Mulino)
 1143rd Anti-Aircraft Oder Regiment (Novy)
 159th Separate Anti-Tank Battalion (Mulino)
 84th Separate Reconnaissance Battalion (Nizhny Novgorod)
 145th Separate Engineer Sapper Battalion (Seyma)
 692nd Separate Signal Battalion (Novy)
 9th Separate Electronic Warfare Battalion (Bor)
 625th Separate NBC protection Battalion
 152nd Separate Maintenance Battalion
 911th Separate Supply Battalion
 231st Separate Medical Battalion

2017 
 Headquarters (Valuyki)
 237th Guards Tank Regiment (Soloti)
 252nd Guards Motor Rifle Stalingrad-Korsun Regiment (Boguchar)
 752nd Guards Motor Rifle Regiment (Valuyki, Soloti)
 99th Guards Self-Propelled Pomeranian Regiment (Boguchar)
 1143rd Anti-Aircraft Oder Regiment
 84th Separate Reconnaissance Battalion (Valuyki)
 159th Separate Anti-Tank Artillery Battalion
 692nd Separate Signal Battalion (Valuyki)
 337th Separate Engineer-Sapper Battalion (Boguchar)
 911th Separate Supply Battalion (Boguchar)
 231st Separate Medical Battalion (Boguchar)
 Separate UAV Company
 Separate EW Company
 Separate NBC protection company

Combat regiments/battalions of the division, 2021 
 237th Tank Regiment (Valuyki and Soloti, Belgorod Oblast, Military Unit Number 91726)
 245th Motorised Rifle Regiment (Soloti, established in December 2021)
 252nd Motor Rifle Regiment (Boguchar, Voronezh Oblast, MUN 91711)
 752nd Guards Motor Rifle Regiment (Valuyki and Soloti, Belgorod Oblast, MUN 34670)
 84th Reconnaissance Battalion (Valuyki and Soloti, Belgorod Oblast, MUN 22263)
 1143rd Anti-Aircraft Missile Regiment (Belgorod Oblast)
 99th Self-propelled Artillery Regiment (Boguchar, Voronezh Oblast, MUN 91727)
 159th Anti-Tank Battalion (Boguchar, Voronezh Oblast, MUN 81989)

Commanders 
 2008-2010? Major General Konstantin Georgyevich Kastornov
 25.10.2011–after June 2014 Colonel Sergei Semyonovich Nyrkov
 ...
 2016–2019 Major General Andrei Yuryevich Ruzinskiy
 12.01.2019–present Colonel/Major General Aleksei Vyacheslavovich Avdeyev

Sources 

June 1998 report by Andrew Duncan in Jane's Intelligence Review

003
Military units and formations established in 1997
Military units and formations disestablished in 2009
Military units and formations established in 2016
Military units and formations awarded the Order of the Red Banner